The Hilt-Vogel Palace is a historic building in Victory Square in Timișoara, Romania. It was built between 1911 and 1913, according to the plans of Hungarian architect . The building is attached to the Széchényi Palace, designed by the same architect. The architecture of the building corresponds to the Art Nouveau style, the szecesszió current, and is made of brick, reinforced concrete, iron and tin and copper elements in the case of the parapets of the balconies.

On the ground floor of the building is the Helios art gallery (former art gallery of the Timișoara Plastic Fund), moved here in 1968. Over the years it has hosted over 1,000 exhibitions of visual artists from Timișoara, including , Adalbert Luca, Julius Podlipny and Romul Nuțiu.

References 

Buildings and structures in Timișoara
Art Nouveau architecture in Romania
Buildings and structures completed in 1913